Armon Ben-Naim (born 6 February 1990) is an Israeli professional association football player and current under-19 international.

Biography

Playing career 
Ben-Naim made his league debut in a Liga Leumit match against Hapoel Acre on 24 April 2008 when he replaced Daniel Heidman in the 65th minute.

References

External links 
 

1990 births
Living people
Israeli footballers
Hapoel Petah Tikva F.C. players
Hapoel Nir Ramat HaSharon F.C. players
Beitar Kfar Saba F.C. players
Maccabi Ironi Amishav Petah Tikva F.C. players
Israeli Premier League players
Liga Leumit players
Footballers from Petah Tikva
Israeli people of Moroccan-Jewish descent
Association football forwards